Hanover (1884–1899) was a champion American Thoroughbred racehorse won his first 17 races. He was the last American stallion to be the leading sire in North America for four consecutive years until Bold Ruler achieved the feat in 1965.

Background
Hanover was a chestnut colt bred at Colonel E. Clay's Runnymede Farm. Hanover was by Hindoo from Bourbon Belle by Bonnie Scotland.  At the farm's yearling sale in May 1885, Hanover was sold to the Dwyer Brothers Stable for $1,250, where he joined Tremont, a very precocious two-year-old also born in 1884.

Racing record
Trained by Frank McCabe, at age two, Hanover won all three races he contested: the Hopeful Stakes, the July Stakes, and the Sapling Stakes.  With Tremont retired, the Dwyers turned to Hanover as the mainstay for the Dwyer Stable. Hanover started in 27 races at the age of three, racing at distances ranging from four furlongs (800 m) to two miles (3,200 m.), he won 20 times (including the Belmont Stakes by 15 lengths) and finished out of the money only once.  Before finishing his first two seasons of racing, Hanover had won 17 consecutive races.

After several losses at age four, and an obvious lameness to the right forefoot, Hanover was nerved and given the remainder of the year to recover. At age five, he lost three times in his first four starts, but finished the season with 9 wins from his 17 race starts. For most of his racing career, Hanover raced against older and top-class horses while conceding them large weights. Hanover stopped racing as America's greatest earner with a career total of $118,887.  From his 50 starts, he won 32 races, was second 14 times, and finished third twice, only unplaced twice.

Stud record
After his racing career ended, Hanover was sold to Colonel Milton Young and sent to his McGrathiana Stud farm near Lexington, Kentucky, where he enjoyed a very successful breeding career, becoming the leading sire in the United States for four consecutive years (1885–1889). His offspring include  Hall of Fame inductee Hamburg, as well as David Garrick, Halma, Compute, The Commoner, Handspring, Half Time, and Yankee.  In addition, he was the damsire of Triple Crown winner Sir Barton and also damsire of the great racing filly Tanya, winner of the 1905 Belmont Stakes. 

While pawing, Hanover was unable to feel the pain in his 'unnerved' foot, and broke his coffin bone. This led to septicemia, and his condition worsened before he was humanely euthanized in March 1899.

Following the creation of the National Museum of Racing and Hall of Fame, Hanover was part of the first group of horses inducted in 1955.

Pedigree

Sire line tree

Hanover
Buck Massie
Jake
Buckleya
Halma
Alan-a-Dale
Barnsdale
Smart Set
Acacia
Oversight
Mirebeau
Insight
Hammon
Handsome
The Commoner
Simon D.
Johnnie Blake
Doctor Boots
Countless
Parmer
Great Britain
Ben Holladay
Handspring
Major Daingerfield
Handout
Trouble
Heywood
Palo Alto
Hamburg
Inflexible
Textile
Pluvious
Strephon
Dandelion
Battleaxe
Burgomaster
Bourgeois
Burgoright
Glasgow
Sebastolbol
Portugal
Orison
The Irishman
Baby Wolf
Hillside
Borrow
Buskin
Prince Eugene
Happy Go Lucky
Handball
Handsel
Grover Hughes
Colonel Livingstone
Sanders
Half Time
Handcuff
David Garrick
Star of Hanover
Withers
Admonition
Holstein
Abe Frank
Black Stock
Mentor
Wise Counsellor
Good Advice
Supreme Court
Deliberator
Barre Granite
Kaffir
Kaffir Boy
King Hanover
Prince Ahmed
Luck and Charity
Serpent
Yankee
Dinna Ken
Yankee Gun
Joe Madden
Marse Abe
Marse Hughes
Naushon
Nonpareil
Penobscot

See also
 List of leading Thoroughbred racehorses

References

 "The Spell of the Turf" by Samuel C. Hildreth and James R. Crowell, J. B. Lippincott & Co., 1926
 Hanover's page in the Hall of Fame

1884 racehorse births
1899 racehorse deaths
Racehorses trained in the United States
Racehorses bred in Kentucky
Belmont Stakes winners
American Thoroughbred Horse of the Year
United States Thoroughbred Racing Hall of Fame inductees
United States Champion Thoroughbred Sires
Thoroughbred family 21
Byerley Turk sire line